Lucjan Karpiński is a Polish diplomat, since 2021 ambassador to Jordan.

Life 
Lucjan Karpiński in 2008 joined the Ministry of Foreign Affairs. He was responsible for the evacuation of the Polish citizens from the places at risk of conflicts and in difficult situations abroad (e.g. whose travel agencies went bankrupt). In 2010, he was posted at the Embassy in Abu Dhabi, being in charge of economic and consular relations. At the Ministry he served the deputy director of the Consular Department and the Inspectorate of the Foreign Service (2018).

On 27 November 2020 he was appointed Poland Ambassador to Jordan. He began his term on 15 February 2021 and presented copies of his credentials the on 7 March 2021.

References 

20th-century births
Ambassadors of Poland to Jordan
Living people
Year of birth missing (living people)